The John A. Plummer House is a historic house at 259 Pearl Street in Marianna, Arkansas.  It is a two-story wood-frame structure, built c. 1900 for John Plummer, owner of a local hardware store who served four terms as county judge, and briefly as mayor of Marianna.  The house is an excellent local example of a transitional Queen Anne-Colonial Revival structure, with a gingerbread-decorated wraparound porch, and numerous projections and roof dormers.

The house was listed on the National Register of Historic Places in 1998.

See also
National Register of Historic Places listings in Lee County, Arkansas

References

Houses on the National Register of Historic Places in Arkansas
Queen Anne architecture in Arkansas
Colonial Revival architecture in Arkansas
Houses completed in 1900
Houses in Lee County, Arkansas
National Register of Historic Places in Lee County, Arkansas